Dash Bashi (also Romanized as Dāsh Bāshī and Dāshbāshī; also known as Dāsh Bāsh, Dashbash, and Sar Sang) is a village in Minjavan-e Sharqi Rural District, Minjavan District, Khoda Afarin County, East Azerbaijan Province, Iran. At the 2006 census, its population was 41, in 10 families. The village is populated by the Kurdish Chalabianlu tribe.

References 

Populated places in Khoda Afarin County
Kurdish settlements in East Azerbaijan Province